San Carlos Airport (Spanish: Aeródromo de San Carlos)  is an airfield serving San Carlos, Río San Juan Department, Nicaragua. The domestic airline La Costeña has daily scheduled flights from Managua to San Carlos.

Airlines and destinations

See also

 List of airports in Nicaragua
 Transport in Nicaragua

References

External links
 OpenStreetMap - San Carlos
 OurAirports - San Carlos

Airports in Nicaragua
Río San Juan Department